Takhtabad (also Romanized as Takhtābād) is a village in Howmeh Rural District, in the Central District of Lamerd County, Fars Province, Iran. At the 2006 census, its population was 19, in 7 families.

References 

Populated places in Lamerd County